Tweet often refers to:

 Tweet (bird call), a type of bird vocalization
 Tweet, a post on the social media platform Twitter

Tweet may also refer to:

People
 Tweet (singer) (born 1971), American R&B and soul singer-songwriter
 Jonathan Tweet, game designer

Other uses
 Samuel Tweet, a character of the British actor and comedian Freddie Davies (born 1937)
 The Tweets, artists' name under which "The Birdie Song" charted in the UK in 1981
 Cessna T-37 Tweet, a twin-engine United States trainer-attack type aircraft

See also
 Tweed (disambiguation)
 Tweeter (disambiguation)
 Tweety (disambiguation)
 
 
 TweetDeck, a social media dashboard application for management of Twitter accounts